Farrelly is an anglicised form of Ó Faircheallaigh, a family name of the Irish nobility from County Cavan. The patronym means "descendant of Faircheallaigh", whose name means "super war". Faircheallaigh was the son of Ailill, a 7th-great-grandson of Niall, King of Ireland. He was made the heir of Saint Máedóc of Ferns in the 7th century and his Ó Faircheallaigh descendants were the Abbots of Drumlane for 7 centuries until David Ó Faircheallaigh became Bishop of Kilmore.

The surname was anglicised on emigration across the Anglosphere, where Major Patrick Farrelly (m. Elizabeth Mead) founded the Farrelly political family of Pennsylvania with his son David Farrelly, author of the third Pennsylvania Constitution (1836); and General Terrence Farrelly was the first judge of Arkansas County, Speaker of the General Assembly of Arkansas Territory and author of the first Arkansas Constitution (1836); his son John Farrelly (m. Martha Clay) was a politician and his grandson John Patrick Farrelly was Bishop of Cleveland. The surname became Farley and John Farley became Cardinal Archbishop of New York.

Early history

The name was conceived in the 7th century when Saint Máedóc of Ferns baptised and renamed the sons of Ailill, who was a 7th-great-grandson of Niall, High King of Ireland, as per his pedigree recorded in the Lives of Irish Saints, which reads: "Ailill, son of Rechtaide, son of Eitin, son of Felim, son of Caol, son of Áed, son of Ailill, son of Erc, son of Eógan, son of Niall of the Nine Hostages." The brothers mac Ailill were thus named Fearghus and Faircheallaigh (otherwise written as Faircellach) and were made Saint Máedóc's heirs to Rosinver Abbey and Drumlane Abbey respectively. Faircellach became the first Abbot of Drumlane in 624. While the Irish title for a saint's heir can be coarb or erenagh, the Annals of the Kingdom of Ireland provide an authoritative translation in a note for the year 1025: Dubhinsi Ua Faircheallaigh, herenagh of Druim-leathan [...] died."

The Life of Máedóc of Ferns states: "Once when Máedóc was at Ferns at the end of his time, the angel of the Lord revealed to him that the term of his days and the end of his life was now approaching and drawing nigh, and bade him go to the place of his resurrection, and to the site of his burial, and to leave his churches and noble annoits, and his chosen sanctuaries, to their native gentry and to their proper heirs after him. Máedóc did so. He left Ferns and its lands under the authority of Cele and Aedan, and with their race and descendants, together with the perpetual obligation of levying and collecting the tribute dues of Leinster, and of dividing them impartially among his churches and coarbs, as we said above. He went thence to Drumlane, and did the same in that church. He left the headship and coarbship of that church with Urcain, son of Ailill, who was called Faircellach. Máedóc had baptized this man, Urcain, and given him the name of Faircellach; for these were the two first attendants that Máedóc had, viz. Faircellach and Fergus his brother, two sons of Ailill." The descendants of Faircheallaigh were thereafter called the Ó Faircheallaigh and from that time onwards were the Abbots of Drumlane Abbey in County Cavan, Ireland. According to the Life, Faircheallaigh's other brother, Fearghus (otherwise written as Fergus) was made the first Abbot of Rosinver in County Leitrim.

The Life then gives the succession of the Ó Faircheallaigh up to the time of Fergal ua Ruairc, King of Connacht from 956 to 967: "When fierce Maedoc died, both wall and great garden, the church with its horned cattle, were entrusted by him to Faircheallaigh. After Faircheallaigh died, the protection of the church was entrusted to the welcoming countenance which never refused a company, to the noble man, to Maelchiaráin. Cúduilig, short was his activity, after forcible Maelchiaráin; Three years were these two undoubtedly in the coarbship after one another. Maelbrigde of the melodious voice, Concobar was his son; Maelbrigde did not succeed to the fair church, but his son Concobar succeeded."

Abbots of Drumlane

 Maelchiaráin Ó Faircheallaigh, Abbot of Drumlane (?)
 Cúduilig Ó Faircheallaigh, Abbot of Drumlane (?)
 Records lost through 965 (see the burning of Drumlane)
 Conchobhar Ó Faircheallaigh, Abbot of Drumlane (965–)
 Dubhinsi Ó Faircheallaigh, Abbot of Drumlane (–1025)
 Conaig Ó Faircheallaigh, Abbot of Drumlane (–1059)
 Muiredach Ó Faircheallaigh, Abbot of Drumlane (–1257)
 Niall Ó Faircheallaigh, Abbot of Drumlane (–1357)
 William Ó Faircheallaigh, Abbot of Drumlane (–1368)
 Muiredach Ó Faircheallaigh, Abbot of Drumlane (1368–)
 William Ó Faircheallaigh, Abbot of Drumlane  (–1400)
 Maurice Ó Faircheallaigh, Abbot of Drumlane (1400–)
 Muiredach Ó Faircheallaigh, Abbot of Drumlane (–1438)
 Nicholas Ó Faircheallaigh, Abbot of Drumlane (1438–)

Modern Era

Several Farrellys are mentioned in the Fiants of 19 January 1586 when Queen Elizabeth I of England granted them pardons for fighting against the Queen's forces in an Irish regiment of the Spanish Army in the Eighty Years' War. The 1882 transcription of the Fiants misspells the name, as recorded in Document 4813: "Pardon to Hugh, son of Hugh, son of William Firielli of Droumlain; Patrick son of Hugh, son of William Firielli of same; Moyle-Shaughelen, son of Gillpatrick, son of William Firielli; John, son of Gillpatrick, son of William Firielli; Henry, son of Gillpatrick, son of William Firielli; Donel, son of Gillpatrick, son of Hugh Firielli; Edmond, son of Hugh, son of Hugh Firielli; Gillpatrick, son of Thomas, son of Gillpatrick Firielli; Shane, son of Morrish, son of Mahowne Firielli." In the Census of Ireland, 1911, there were 1,075 Farrellys recorded in County Cavan.

Notable Farrellys

Alexander Farrelly (1923–2002), American governor
Bernie Farrelly (born c. 1967), Irish athlete
Bobby Farrelly (born 1958), American filmmaker
Columb Farrelly (died 2008), Irish composer
David Farrelly (1807–1890), American politician
Denis Farrelly (1912–1974), Irish politician
Dick Farrelly (1916–1990), Irish poet
Elizabeth Farrelly (born 1957), Australian author
Farrelly brothers (born 1956/1958), Irish filmmakers
Frank Farrelly (1931–2013), Irish author
Gareth Farrelly (born 1975), Irish footballer
Gary Farrelly (born 1983), Irish artist
Gearoid Farrelly (born c. 1988), Irish comedian
John Patrick Farrelly Jr. (1856–1921), American bishop
John Patrick Farrelly Sr. (born c. 1820), American politician
John V. Farrelly (born 1954), Irish politician
John Wilson Farrelly (1809–1860), American politician
Midget Farrelly (1944–2016), Australian surfer
Patrick Farrelly (1770–1826), American politician
Paul Farrelly (born 1962), British politician
Peter Farrelly (born 1956), American filmmaker
Stephen Farrelly (born 1978), Irish wrestler
Terrence Farrelly (1795–?), American general

See also
Farley (disambiguation)
Drumlane Abbey
Irish nobility

References

Surnames of Irish origin